Euphyia frustata is a moth of the family Geometridae. The species can be found in Europe. The wingspan is about 28 to 34 mm.

External links

Fauna Europaea
Lepiforum.de
Vlindernet.nl 

Euphyia
Moths of Europe
Taxa named by Georg Friedrich Treitschke
Moths described in 1828